TAFE Queensland SkillsTech (previously known as SkillsTech Australia and Trade and Technician Skills Institute) is a pre-eminent provider of vocational education and training in Queensland, Australia. It operates four trade training centres across Brisbane. TAFE Queensland SkillsTech offers specialist trade training for many industrial areas.

History 
In July 2017, the process of consolidating TAFE Queensland SkillsTech and five other regional registered training organisations (RTOs) into a single RTO began. TAFE Queensland SkillsTech consolidated into the TAFE Queensland organisation, and no longer operate as a separate RTO. TAFE QLD offers admissions to international students in up to 22 study areas. TAFE's international students are mostly from South Korea, China, India, Brazil, Japan, Philippines, Columbia, Nepal, Hong Kong, Italy, Germany, United Kingdom, Taiwan, Sweden, Papua New Guinea, Vietnam, Thailand, South Africa, Indonesia, Malaysia.

Training centres
 Acacia Ridge
 Alexandra Hills
 Bracken Ridge
 Eagle Farm

TAFE Queensland SkillsTech and TAFE Queensland Brisbane co-operated with the Alexandra Hills and Bracken Ridge locations.

References

External links 

 TAFE Queensland

Australian vocational education and training providers
Vocational education
TAFE Queensland
Education in Queensland